The legislative district of Mandaue, officially the lone district of Mandaue, is the representation of the highly urbanized city of Mandaue in the Congress of the Philippines. The city started to be represented in the lower house of the Congress by its lone congressional district after the 2022 elections.

Lone District 
Population (2020): 364,116

See also 
Legislative districts of Cebu

References 

Mandaue
Mandaue
Mandaue
Constituencies established in 2021